Akahoshi (written: 赤星 lit. "red star") is a Japanese surname. Notable people with the surname include:

, Japanese baseball player
, Japanese footballer
, Japanese footballer
, former Japanese footballer

Japanese-language surnames